Russian flu may refer to:

 1889–1890 flu pandemic
 1977 Russian flu
 1998 Russian financial crisis
 "Russian Flu", the 5th episode of the 1st season of the television series Northern Exposure
 Russian Flu, a 1937 Swedish comedy film